Tobico Marsh, located just north of Bay City, Michigan, is part of the Bay City Recreation Area. Tobico Marsh was designated as a registered National Natural Landmark in 1976 because of its large size, relatively undisturbed condition and variety of aquatic plant life.

Habitat

Comprising , the marsh contains three distinct habitats: a wide expanse of open water, an extensive area of marshland, and a mixed hardwood forest.

History
The first private ownership of Tobico Marsh was by logging interests. As logging diminished, the land was sold to several individuals who formed the Tobico Hunting and Fishing Club. In 1956, Guy Garber and Frank Andersen, the only surviving members, realized the value of the area as a wildlife refuge. Andersen donated the property to the State of Michigan in 1957 and it became the Tobico State Wildlife Refuge. Later, the State obtained adjacent land and formed the Tobico Marsh State Game Area, with the wildlife refuge as its core. In 1995, the refuge and game area were merged with the adjacent Bay City State Park, forming the Bay City State Recreation Area.

External links
 Bay City State Recreation Area

References

Protected areas of Bay County, Michigan
National Natural Landmarks in Michigan
Marshes of the United States
Wetlands of Michigan
Landforms of Bay County, Michigan